Prunus subg. Cerasus is a subgenus of Prunus. Species of the subgenus have a single winter bud per axil. The flowers are usually in small corymbs or umbels of several together (occasionally solitary, e.g. P. serrula), but some species have short racemes (e.g. P. maacki). The fruit is a drupe and has no obvious groove along the side. The subgenus is native to the temperate regions of the Northern Hemisphere, with two species in North America (P. emarginata and P. pensylvanica), four in Europe (P. avium, P. cerasus, P. fruticosa and P. mahaleb), two in North Africa (P. avium and P. mahaleb), and the remainder in Asia.

The fresh fruits of sweet cherry (worldwide) and Chinese cherry (in China) are consumed raw. The fruits of some species such as sour cherry are used to make desserts, sauce, jam and wine. The seeds of mahaleb cherry are used to make mahleb. Many species are cultivated as an ornamental tree, known as cherry blossoms.

Species 
Species of Prunus subg. Cerasus are known as true cherries, which include:
 Prunus apetala (Siebold & Zucc.) Franch. & Sav. – clove cherry
 Prunus avium (L.) L. – sweet cherry, wild cherry, mazzard or gean
 Prunus campanulata Maxim. – bell-flowered cherry, Taiwan cherry or Formosan cherry
 Prunus canescens Bois. – grey-leaf cherry
 Prunus caudata Franch. – caudate cherry
 Prunus cerasoides D. Don. – wild Himalayan cherry
 Prunus cerasus L. – sour cherry
 Prunus clarofolia C.K.Schneid. – shiny-leaf cherry
 Prunus conadenia Koehne
 Prunus conradinae Koehne
 Prunus crataegifolia Hand.-Mazz. – hawthorn-leaf cherry
 Prunus cyclamina Koehne – cyclamen cherry or Chinese flowering cherry
 Prunus discadenia Koehne
 Prunus discoidea (T.T.Yu & C.L.Li) Z.Wei & Y.B.Chang
 Prunus dolichadenia Cardot
 Prunus emarginata (Douglas ex Hook.) Walp. –  bitter cherry or Oregon cherry
 Prunus fruticosa Pall. – European dwarf cherry, dwarf cherry, Mongolian cherry or steppe cherry
 Prunus hainanensis (G.A.Fu & Y.S.Lin) H.Yu, N.H.Xia & H.G.Ye – Hainan cherry
 Prunus hefengensis (X.R.Wang & C.B.Shang) Y.H.Tong & N.H.Xia – Hefeng cherry
 Prunus henryi (C.K.Schneid.) Koehne
 Prunus himalaica Kitam. – Nepalese cherry
 Prunus incisa Thunb. – Fuji cherry
 Prunus itosakura Siebold
 Prunus jamasakura Siebold ex Koidz. – Japanese mountain cherry or Japanese hill cherry
 Prunus leveilleana Koehne (syn. Prunus verecunda (Koidz.) Koehne) – Korean mountain cherry
 Prunus maackii Rupr. (syn. Prunus glandulifolia Rupr. & Maxim.) – Manchurian cherry
 Prunus mahaleb L. – Saint Lucie cherry, rock cherry, perfumed cherry or mahaleb cherry
 Prunus matuurai Sasaki – Taiping Mountain cherry
 Prunus maximowiczii Rupr. – Miyama cherry or Korean cherry
 Prunus mugus Hand.-Mazz.
 Prunus nipponica Matsum. – Takane cherry, peak cherry or Japanese alpine cherry
 Prunus pananensis Z.L.Chen, W.J.Chen & X.F.Jin – Pan'an cherry
 Prunus patentipila Hand.-Mazz.
 Prunus pensylvanica L.f. – pin cherry, fire cherry, or wild red cherry
 Prunus pleiocerasus Koehne
 Prunus polytricha Koehne
 Prunus pseudocerasus Lindl. – Chinese cherry or Chinese sour cherry
 Prunus pusilliflora Cardot
 Prunus rufa Wall ex Hook.f. – Himalayan cherry
 Prunus rufoides C.K.Schneid. (syn. Prunus dielsiana C.K. Schneid.) – tailed-leaf cherry
 Prunus sargentii Rehder – northern Japanese hill cherry, northern Japanese mountain cherry or Sargent's cherry
 Prunus schneideriana Koehne
 Prunus serrula Franch. – paperbark cherry, birch bark cherry or Tibetan cherry
 Prunus serrulata Lindl. – Japanese cherry, hill cherry, Oriental cherry or East Asian cherry
 Prunus shikokuensis (Moriya) H.Kubota – Shikoku cherry
 Prunus speciosa (Koidz.) Ingram – Oshima cherry
 Prunus stipulacea Maxim.
 Prunus sunhangii D.G.Zhang & T.Deng
 Prunus szechuanica Batalin – Sichuan cherry
 Prunus takasagomontana Sasaki
 Prunus takesimensis Nakai – Ulleungdo cherry
 Prunus tatsienensis Batalin – Kangding cherry
 Prunus transarisanensis Hayata – Alishan cherry
 Prunus trichantha Koehne
 Prunus trichostoma Koehne
 Prunus veitchii Koehne
 Prunus xingshanensis Huan C.Wang – Xingshan cherry
 Prunus yaoiana (W.L.Cheng) Y.H.Tong & N.H.Xia
 Prunus yunnanensis Franch. – Yunnan cherry

Nothospecies in this subgenus include:
 Prunus × chichibuensis H.Kubota & Moriya – Chichibu cherry
 Prunus × compta (Koidz.) Tatew.
 Prunus × dawyckensis Sealy
 Prunus × eminens Beck
 Prunus × fontanesiana (Spach) C.K.Schneid.
 Prunus × furuseana Ohwi
 Prunus × gondouinii (Poit. & Turpin) Rehder
 Prunus × hisauchiana Koidz. ex Hisauti
 Prunus × incam Ingram ex R.T.Olsen & Whittem.
 Prunus × javorkae Kárpáti
 Prunus × juddii E.S.Anderson
 Prunus × kanzakura Makino
 Prunus × kubotana Kawas.
 Prunus × lannesiana (Carrière) E.H.Wilson
 Prunus × mitsuminensis Moriya
 Prunus × miyasakana H.Kubota
 Prunus × mohacsyana Kárpáti
 Prunus × nudiflora (Koehne) Koidz.
 Prunus × oneyamensis Hayashi
 Prunus × parvifolia (Matsum.) Koehne – small-leaved cherry
 Prunus × pugetensis Jacobson & Zika – Puget Sound cherry
 Prunus × sacra Miyoshi
 Prunus × schmittii Rehder
 Prunus × sieboldii (Carrière) Wittm.
 Prunus × stacei Wójcicki
 Prunus × subhirtella Miq. – Higan cherry or spring cherry
 Prunus × syodoi Nakai
 Prunus × tschonoskii Koehne
 Prunus × yedoensis Matsum. – Yoshino cherry or Tokyo cherry
 Prunus × yuyamae Sugim.

Many Prunus species are called "cherries" but not included in this subgenus. They are not considered true cherries. Examples are:
 Bush cherries which have three winter buds per axil, such as Oriental bush cherry (P. japonica), humble bush cherry (P. humilis), Nanking cherry (P. tomentosa) and prostrate cherry (P. prostrata), are now included in Prunus subg. Prunus. Sand cherry (P. pumila) also belongs to P. subg. Prunus.
 Bird cherries (e.g. P. padus, P. grayana, P. napaulensis, P. ssiori), chokecherry (P. virginiana), black cherry (P. serotina), cherry laurels (e.g. P. laurocerasus, P. myrtifolia, P. pleuradenia), holyleaf cherry (P. ilicifolia) and Catalina cherry (P. i. subsp. lyonii) whose flowers and fruits are borne on racemes belong to P. subg. Padus.
 The phylogenetic position of African cherry (P. africana) is still uncertain, but it is definitely not a true cherry species.

Notes

References

External links
 Chokecherry (Prunus virginiana) (trees/handbook Chokecherry III-13, www.ag.ndsu.nodak.edu)

Cerasus
Cherries
Plant subgenera